Bagh Borj (also Romanized as Bāgh Borj) is a village in Soghan Rural District, Soghan District, Arzuiyeh County, Kerman Province, Iran. At the 2006 census, its population was 118, in 24 families.

References 

Populated places in Arzuiyeh County